Urban density is a term used in urban planning and urban design to refer to the number of people inhabiting a given urbanized area. As such it is to be distinguished from other measures of population density. Urban density is considered an important factor in understanding how cities function. Research related to urban density occurs across diverse areas, including economics, health, innovation, psychology and geography as well as sustainability.

A 2019 meta-analysis of 180 studies on a vast number of economic outcomes of urban density concluded that urban density had net positive effects. However, there may be some regressive distributional effects.

Sustainability 

It is commonly asserted that higher density cities are more sustainable than low density cities. Much urban planning theory - particularly in North America, the UK,  Australia, and New Zealand - has been developed premised on raising urban densities, such as New Urbanism, transit-oriented development, and smart growth. This assertion, however, remains a contested or challenged one.

The link between urban density and aspects of sustainability remains a contested area of planning theory. Jan Gehl, prominent Urban Designer and expert on sustainable urbanism, argues that low-density, dispersed cities are unsustainable as they are automobile dependent. NASA, for example, has established a direct correlation between urban density and air pollution. 

Others, such as Randy O'Toole of the Libertarian Cato Institute, point to how raising densities results in more expensive real estate, greater road congestion and more localized air pollution. At a broader level, there is evidence to indicate a strong negative correlation between the total energy consumption of a city and its overall urban density, i.e. the lower the density, the more energy consumed. The location and urban setting where densification processes occur therefore need to be considered for sustainable densification.

Measurement 
Urban density is a very specific measurement of the population of an urbanized area, excluding non-urban land-uses. Non-urban uses include regional open space, agriculture and water-bodies.

There are a variety of other ways of measuring the density of urban areas:

 Population density - the number of human persons per unit area
 Median density - a density metric which measures the density at which the average person lives. It is determined by ranking the census tracts by population density, and taking the density at which fifty percent of the population lives at a higher density and fifty percent lives at a lower density.
 Population-weighted density - a density metric which measures the density at which the average person lives.  It is determined by calculating the standard density of each census tract, assigning each a weight equal to its share of the total population, and then adding the segments.
 Residential density - the number of dwelling units in any given area
 Floor area ratio - the total floor area of buildings divided by land area of the lot upon which the buildings are built
 Employment density - the number of jobs in any given area
 Gross density - any density figure for a given area of land that includes uses not necessarily directly relevant to the figure (usually roads and other transport infrastructure)
 Net density - a density figure for a given area of land that excludes land not directly related to the figure.

Impact 
A 2019 meta-analysis of 180 studies on a vast number of economic outcomes of urban density concluded that urban density had net positive effects. However, there may be some regressive distributional effects.

A 2020 study concluded that urban density "boosts productivity and innovation, improves access to goods and services, reduces typical travel distances, encourages energy efficient construction and transport, and allows broader sharing of scarce urban amenities. However, density is also synonymous with crowding and makes living and moving in cities more costly."

See also 
 Compact city
 List of cities proper by population density
 Smart growth
 Transportation planning
 Urban sprawl
 Urban vitality
 Verticalization

References

Further reading 
 Newman, P and Kenworthy, J (1999) Cities and Sustainability: Overcoming automobile dependence, Washington, D. C. : Island Press 
 Pont, Meta Y. Berghauser and Haupt, Per (2010) Spacematrix: Space, Density and Urban Form, NAi Publishers, 
 Dovey, Kim and Pafka, Elek (2014) "The urban density assemblage: Modelling multiple measures" in Urban Design International, vol.19, nr. 1, pg.66-76

External links 
 MIT Density Atlas
 Urban Density and Energy Consumption

Sustainable urban planning